Word Alive (previously known as New Word Alive) is an annual evangelical Christian conference which originated through a partnership between the UK Christian organisations UCCF and Keswick Ministries.  The conference is focussed on Bible teaching, corporate worship, and family time.  The conference is a continuation of the former Word Alive event which ran within Spring Harvest. As well as attracting around 4000 guests, the conference has historically included the largest evangelical student conference in Europe.

Format

Word Alive is billed as "a Bible holiday week inspiring and refreshing the whole body". There is a full adult programme throughout the day along with activities focussed for children and youth. There is also a specially tailored 'Student Track' conference which is one of the largest Christian student conferences in Europe. The Student Track joins the main programme for the morning Bible Readings, the centrepiece of Word Alive, during which the main speaker for the week gives an in-depth bible study. 

There are a variety of sessions available throughout the day – Bible studies, seminars, activity groups and worship meetings – all designed to equip children, young people, students and adults to serve their church and reach the world with the good news of Jesus Christ. Later in the evening there is an 'After Hours' programme featuring contemporary worship, film nights, live interviews, comedy nights, gigs, as well as the highly anticipated cèilidh.

The majority of guests stay in the on-site accommodation (chalets) provided at the holiday centre, with options for either self-catering or dinner, bed and breakfast. There are also Day Visitor and Events Passes available for those wishing to stay off site in nearby hotels, B&B establishments or holiday cottages.

Venue

From 2008 to 2011 Word Alive was held at the Haven Holiday Park, Hafan y Mor, near Pwllheli in North Wales. From 2012 the conference moved to the Pontins site, Prestatyn Sands, North Wales. 

"Situated between the rolling hills of North Wales and miles of award winning beaches, there is plenty to do in the local area: visit the majestic Conwy Castle, enjoy the fun of the Rhyl Water Park, or even plan a climb up Snowdon!
Prestatyn Holiday Park itself also has plenty to offer, particularly for the children. As well as Captain Crocs Driving School and skate park, we also provide a Clownfish [inflatables] activity area and 5-a-side football and volleyball competitions every year."

History

The first Word Alive event took place as part of Spring Harvest in 1993 and was a partnership between UCCF, Keswick Ministries, Spring Harvest and initially the Proclamation Trust. In 2007, it was announced that Word Alive would no longer be a part of Spring Harvest, and from 2008 would run independently (as New Word Alive) in Pwllheli, rather than Skegness. Press releases explaining the split were released by UCCF,
Keswick Ministries and Bishop Pete Broadbent of the Spring Harvest leadership team. The statements emphasise different factors leading up to the decision to cease working together.  Following a subsequent statement by Pete Broadbent all sides accept that disagreements over Spring Harvest leadership team member Steve Chalke's view of the atonement played at least some part in the split.

From 2008 until 2015 the conference was run over two separate weeks, with different speakers on each. From 2016 onwards Word Alive has been run for a single week only.

Main speakers and worship leaders

References

External links
Word Alive
UCCF page on Word Alive
Christian Today article on separation from Spring Harvest
Article and statements on the reasons for the separation between Word Alive and Spring Harvest

Evangelical Christian conferences
Student religious organisations in the United Kingdom
Recurring events established in 2007